Víctor Olmo Durán (born 17 June 2001) is a Spanish footballer who plays as a left back for Málaga CF.

Club career
Born in Jerez de la Frontera, Cádiz, Andalusia, Olmo represented Cádiz CF and Balón de Cádiz CF before joining Málaga CF's youth setup in 2017. After being initially assigned to the C-team in the regional leagues, he first appeared with the reserves on 18 October 2020, coming on as a second-half substitute for Loren Zúñiga in a 1–0 Tercera División home win over Juventud de Torremolinos CF.

Olmo scored his first senior goal on 16 March 2022, netting the B's equalizer in a 2–1 home success over Alhaurín de la Torre CF. He made his first team debut on 7 May, starting in a 0–0 home draw against Real Oviedo in the Segunda División.

References

External links
Málaga profile

2001 births
Living people
Footballers from Jerez de la Frontera
Spanish footballers
Association football defenders
Segunda División players
Tercera División players
Tercera Federación players
Atlético Malagueño players
Málaga CF players